The Asian County Board (ACB) of the Gaelic Athletic Association (GAA), also sometimes known as Asian GAA, is one of the county boards of the GAA outside Ireland. It is responsible for Gaelic games across Asia and Oceania except for Australia and New Zealand, which are under the auspices of Australasia County board. The county board is also responsible for Asian county teams.

Competitions
The All-China Gaelic Games is a Gaelic games tournament held annually in China between club teams under the auspices of the Gaelic Athletic Association (GAA) and the Asian County Board.

The Derek Brady Trophy is a Gaelic football cup awarded by the Asian County Board. The cup, a crystal replica of the Sam Maguire Cup, was commissioned by the family of Gaelic footballer Derek Brady. Brady was one of the founders of the Taipei Lions club, and died in Taipei in 1996.

Teams
As of 2019, there were approximate 25 club teams overseen by the county board:

References

 
Gaelic games governing bodies
Gaelic games in Asia
GAA